A state dinner in the United States is a formal dinner held in honor of a foreign head of state, such as a king, queen, president, or any head of government. It is hosted by the President of the United States and is usually held in the State Dining Room at the White House in Washington, D.C. Other formal dinners for important people of other nations, such as a prince or princess, are called official dinners, the difference being that the federal government does not pay for them. Nowadays these dinners are more often black tie rather than white tie (see formal wear).

The first state dinner was held on December 22, 1874, by President Ulysses S. Grant to welcome King Kalākaua of the Kingdom of Hawai'i.

Ulysses S. Grant

Herbert Hoover

Franklin D. Roosevelt

Harry S. Truman

Dwight D. Eisenhower

John F. Kennedy

Lyndon B. Johnson

Richard Nixon

Gerald Ford

Jimmy Carter

Ronald Reagan

George H.W. Bush

Bill Clinton

George W. Bush

Barack Obama

Donald Trump

Joe Biden

See also
 List of dining events

References

Cultural lists
White House
Dining events